Diwana may refer to:

Places

Afghanistan
Dīvāneh, Farah
Dīvāneh, Kunduz

India
 Diwana, Panipat, a village in Haryana
 Diwana railway station

Pakistan

Diwana, Balochistan
Diwana Tughal Khel

Films
 Diwana (1952 film), a 1952 Bollywood movie directed by Abdul Rashid Kardar
 Diwana (1967 film), a 1967 Bollywood film directed by Mahesh Kaul

Other
 The feminine of Dewan, a Persian-language title used for a government minister or courtier in various Islamic governments

See also
Deewana (disambiguation)
Diwan (disambiguation)